Strobilaspis is a genus of flies in the family Stratiomyidae.

Species
Strobilaspis flavitarsis James, 1980
Strobilaspis nigrimana Lindner, 1949
Strobilaspis picta James, 1980

References

Stratiomyidae
Brachycera genera
Taxa named by Erwin Lindner
Diptera of North America
Diptera of South America